Pine Grove Rosenwald School, also known as Pine Grove Colored School, is a historic Rosenwald school building located at St. Andrews, Richland County, South Carolina. It was built in 1923, and is a one-story, rectangular gable-front frame building. Its layout is a variant of the two-room schoolhouse and features large banks of tall narrow windows.

It was added to the National Register of Historic Places in 2009.

References

Rosenwald schools in South Carolina
African-American history of South Carolina
School buildings on the National Register of Historic Places in South Carolina
School buildings completed in 1923
Buildings and structures in Richland County, South Carolina
National Register of Historic Places in Richland County, South Carolina
1923 establishments in South Carolina